Benoît Sinner (born 7 August 1984 in Fontenay-aux-Roses) is a French cyclist riding for Peltrax–CS Dammarie-lès-Lys.

Major results

2004
 2nd Road race, National Under-23 Road Championships
2005
 1st Stage 1 Giro delle Regioni
 2nd Overall Kreiz Breizh Elites
 3rd Road race, National Under-23 Road Championships
 3rd Overall Le Triptyque des Monts et Châteaux
1st Stage 3
 4th Road race, UEC European Under-23 Road Championships
 10th Overall Tour du Loir-et-Cher
2006
 1st  Road race, UEC European Under-23 Road Championships
 3rd Boucles de l'Aulne
 6th Overall Boucles de la Mayenne
1st Stage 1
 9th Tro-Bro Léon
2008
 9th Tro-Bro Léon
2009
 3rd Overall Tour de Normandie
2012
 8th Grand Prix des Marbriers
2013
 8th Overall Boucles de la Mayenne
1st Points classification
1st Stage 1
 9th Grand Prix de la ville de Nogent-sur-Oise
2014
 6th Overall Kreiz Breizh Elites
2016
 3rd Overall Tour de Normandie
1st Stage 4

References

1984 births
Living people
French male cyclists